Abschwangen (now Tishino, in Bagrationovsky District) was a small village near Preussisch Eylau in East Prussia some 30 km south of Königsberg, today Kaliningrad Oblast, Russia and the scene of a massacre of German civilians on 29 August 1914.

Prelude 
After Russian troops started their first World War I offensive in East Prussia in August 1914, they reached the small village of Abschwangen on August 27, 1914, without struggle, and marched through. On August 29, 1914, an Imperial German Army reconnaissance unit of four cavalrymen came into the unoccupied village and confronted an Imperial Russian Army motorcar and opened fire. During the ensuing firefight, a single Russian officer, a member of the wealthy and powerful Trubetskoy family of the Russian nobility, was killed, and the car returned to the village of Almenhausen (now Kashtanovo), some 5 km east of Abschwangen.

The massacre 

After the return of the car to Almenhausen, the Russian troops executed nine civilians (Mayor Herman Prang, Farmer Stadie, Hermann Marienberg and six unknown refugees), who were by chance standing next to them and burned down 70 buildings out of 81 existing houses. 
At the same time some other troops marched to Abschwangen, where they started to execute the male inhabitants and burned down houses and farm buildings. In Abschwangen 78 buildings out of 101 existing were destroyed. 
During the massacre, 65 people (28 locals, 37 refugees from southern East Prussia) were killed:

from Abschwangen: Brüderlein, Fritz; Dombrowski, Fritz; Dunkel, Franz; Eggert, Johanna; Freimuth, Karl; Friedel, Walter; Frisch, Hermann; Gendatis, Franz; Großmann, August; Heinrich, Richard;  Hochwald, Albert; Judel, Lina; Kemmer, Julius; Kösling, Friedrich; Krause, Ernst; Küßner, Karl; Lange, Christoph; Naujoks, Friedrich; Oppermann, Albert;  Packheiser, Gustav; Regotzki, Karl; Riemann, August;  Riemann, Franz; Riemann, Karl; Rosenbaum, Franz; Schröder, Friedrich; Waschkau, Gottfried; Witt, Elisabeth;
from Allenau:  Burblies, Gustav; Hinz, Friedrich; Hinz, Karl; Reimer, Albert;
from Bönkeim:  Barteleit, Johanna;
from Böttchersdorf: Gawlick, Richard; Gawlick, Rudolf; Hensel, Franz;
from Budweitschen:  Schippel, Wilhelm; Willuhn, Karl;
from Darkehmen: Forstreuter, Karl;
from Dettmitten: Arndt, Franz; Arndt, Wilhelm; Arnswald, Otto; Ewert, Friedrich; Grube, Richard; Mischke, Friedrich; Naujok, Gustav; Petschkuhn, Karl; Petschkuhn, Otto;
from Dommelkeim: Nelson, Emil;
from Korschen:  Diester, Ewald;
from Kortmedien: Görke, Ernst; Holz, Ernst; Motzkau, Gustav; Saul, Gustav; Schirrmacher, Johann; Schoen, Gustav;
from Langendorf: Czibold, Fritz; Dudda, Michael; Marwinski, Paul; Rogowski, Christian; Wicesanski, Michael;
from Löwenhagen: Hollstein, Leopold;
from Schlangen: Marquardt, Bernhard
one Unidentified;

Aftermath 
Due to the German success at the Battle of Tannenberg, Russian troops retreated from the Abschwangen region, and the village was recaptured without a struggle by German troops on September 3, 1914.  A memorial was built to the 74 killed civilians in 1924, but it, like the whole village, was destroyed during World War II in 1945.

References 

Horst Schulz, Preußisch Eylau - eine Kreisstadt in Ostpreußen, Lübeck 1998 (German) 
Horst Schulz, Der Kreis Preußisch Eylau, Verden 1983 (German)

East Prussia
Mass murder in 1914
August 1914 events
Massacres in 1914
German Empire in World War I
Russian Empire in World War I
1914 in the Russian Empire
World War I crimes by the Russian Empire
World War I massacres
History of Kaliningrad Oblast
Massacres in Germany
1914 murders in the Russian Empire